Avon Apartments is a historic three-story building in Ogden, Utah. It was built in 1908 for investor Ella Georgeanna Lewis Van Why, and designed in the Romanesque Revival style. It was purchased by Dr. Edward I. Rich in 1914, and he added front porches designed in the Prairie School style. It has been listed on the National Register of Historic Places since December 31, 1987.

References

Buildings and structures in Ogden, Utah
National Register of Historic Places in Weber County, Utah
Romanesque Revival architecture in Utah
Prairie School architecture in Utah
Residential buildings completed in 1908
1908 establishments in Utah